Jossette Campo-Atayde (born May 19, 1971), better known as Sylvia Sanchez, is a Filipino actress and comedian. She is the wife of Art Atayde and the mother of actors Arjo Atayde and actress Ria Atayde.

Personal life
Sanchez was born and raised in Nasipit, Agusan del Norte. Her father, a retired seafarer, abandoned their family when she was 10. At this early age, she realized she would need to be the breadwinner. She worked so that she could send her siblings to school.

She has four children with husband Art Atayde: Arjo, Ria, Gela, and Xavi. She also has another daughter named Pia Marie from a previous relationship.

On March 31, 2020, Sylvia announced that she and her husband Art Atayde have tested positive for the COVID-19 disease.

Career 
Sanchez first started as a sexy actress before transcending into one of the country's best known actresses. In 1997-1999 she starred in the critically acclaimed primetime soap opera Esperanza as the main anti-heroine. In the 2000s, majority of her work were supporting roles but in 2012-2013, after doing roles for both GMA and ABS-CBN, she would do another antagonist role in Mundo Man ay Magunaw opposite Eula Valdez.

In 2016, she took the role in The Greatest Love as a mother struggling with Alzheimer’s, a portrayal that gave her more recognition worldwide. From 2017-2018, she starred in Hanggang Saan opposite her son Arjo Atayde.

Starring as Luzviminda Mabunga in the ABS-CBN teleserye Pamilya Ko, alongside Joey Marquez 1 year before COVID-19 pandemic in the Philippines.

Filmography

Television

Film

Awards and nominations

References

External links 
 

1971 births
Living people
ABS-CBN personalities
Filipino film actresses
Filipino television actresses
People from Agusan del Norte
People from Pasig
Visayan people